The Winning of Barbara Worth is a 1926 American silent Western film directed by Henry King, and starring Ronald Colman, Vilma Bánky and Gary Cooper (who replaced Monte Blue). Based on Harold Bell Wright's novel The Winning of Barbara Worth, the film is remembered for the climactic flood sequence, depicting the 1905 formation of the Salton Sea.

Plot
As a child, Barbara is orphaned when her settler parents perish trying to cross a California desert. She is rescued and raised by Jefferson Worth, who dreams of irrigating the desert. Fifteen years later, Willard Holmes, the chief engineer of a company intent on diverting the Colorado River to do just that, arrives and is smitten with Barbara. However, he has a rival for her affections: local cowboy Abe Lee, who realizes, toward the end of the picture, that Barbara's love for him will never be anything more than the love a sister feels for a brother. Willard Holmes's greedy employer, meanwhile, refuses to spend the money to reinforce his gigantic water project. This results in a catastrophic flood, the visual and dramatic highlight of the film. Barbara is impressed by Willard's heroism, and he promises to return to marry her after he has conquered the Colorado River and turned the desert into a bountiful paradise.

Cast
 Ronald Colman as Willard Holmes
 Vilma Bánky as Barbara Worth
 Gary Cooper as Abe Lee
 Charles Willis Lane as Jefferson Worth
 Paul McAllister as The Seer
 E. J. Ratcliffe as James Greenfield
 Clyde Cook as Tex
 Erwin Connelly as Pat Mooney
 Ed Brady as McDonald
 Sammy Blum as Horace Blanton
 Fred Esmelton as George Cartwright
 Bill Patton as Little Rosebud

Production
The movie was filmed in California's Imperial Valley and in the Black Rock Desert of Nevada.

Further reading

References

External links

 
 
 
 
 "The Story of the Making of The Winning of Barbara Worth"

1926 films
1926 Western (genre) films
American black-and-white films
American romantic drama films
Films based on American novels
Films directed by Henry King
Films shot in Nevada
Samuel Goldwyn Productions films
Films with screenplays by Frances Marion
1926 romantic drama films
Flood films
Silent American Western (genre) films
1920s American films
Silent romantic drama films
Silent American drama films